María José Palacios Espinoza (born 18 October 1998) is an Ecuadorian boxer. She competed in the women's lightweight event at the 2020 Summer Olympics.

References

External links
 

1998 births
Living people
Ecuadorian women boxers
Olympic boxers of Ecuador
Boxers at the 2020 Summer Olympics
Place of birth missing (living people)
20th-century Ecuadorian women
21st-century Ecuadorian women
South American Games medalists in boxing
Competitors at the 2018 South American Games